Charles Grymes or Grimes (October 10, 1693 – December 1, 1743) was Virginia planter and politician who represented Richmond County on Virginia's Northern Neck in the House of Burgesses (1728–1734).

Early life and education

The younger of two sons born to the former Alice Townley (1675–1710) of Gloucester County and her husband John Grymes  (1660–1709). He had an elder brother also John Grymes (1691–1749) and sisters Anne (1689–1730; who never married) and Elizabeth Lucy Grymes (1692–1750) who married John Holcomb, and whose son (also John Holcombe) would serve in the House of Virginia Delegates. Their father built a plantation called "Grymesby" in Middlesex County. Their grandfather Rev. Chales Grymes (1612–1661) had emigrated from Kent, England to become rector of Hampton parish in York County in 1645, and had two sons and a daughter, as well as occasionally preached at what became North Farnham Parish in 1783 (previously Farnham parish of then-vast Rappahannock County. This boy received a private education appropriate to his class, and also attended the College of William and Mary in 1705. His brother John, who inherited Grymesby, would also represent Middlesex County in the House of Burgesses before being appointed to the Governor's Council.

Meanwhile, Charles Grymes married Frances Jenings, daughter of Edmund Jenings, a member of the Virginia Governor's Council. Two of their daughters married powerful planters. Frances Grymes would marry Philip Ludwell III, a merchant and planter who would sit in both houses of the Virginia General Assembly before moving to England. Her sister Lucy Grymes married Henry Lee. And Sarah Grymes (1738–1764) married John Reynolds.

Career

Grymes ultimately inherited Morattico plantation in Richmond County, Virginia, as well as about 1000 acres at the headwaters of the Rappahanock River in what became Rappahannock County. Grymes becames the Richmond County sheriff in 1724–1725. Richmond County voters elected him as one of their two representatives in the House of Burgesses in 1728, for the session that lasted until 1734, when they replaced both burgesses by J. Woodbridge and William Fantleroy.

Death and legacy

Grymes died intestate in 1743 and his son in law Philip Ludlow was appointed as executor of his estate.

References

Virginia colonial people
House of Burgesses members
1693 births
1743 deaths
People from Richmond County, Virginia